The 2023 European Rally Championship is the 71st season of the FIA European Rally Championship, the European continental championship series in rallying. The season is also the tenth following the merge between the European Rally Championship and the Intercontinental Rally Challenge. Efrén Llarena is the reigning drivers champion.

Competitions 

 FIA ERC: Main open championship for all current FIA-homologated cars within sporting classes RC2 to RC5, with Rally2 cars the leading contenders.
 FIA ERC3: Second tier, specifically for the Rally3 class.
 FIA ERC4: Third ERC tier, the first for front-wheel-drive cars. Allows Rally4 and Rally5 cars.
 FIA ERC Junior: For drivers aged 27 and under on 1 January 2023 in Rally4 and Rally5 cars on Hankook tyres. This championship will be contested over six of the eight rounds.
 FIA European Rally Championship for Teams: each team can nominate a maximum of three cars (from all categories), counting the two highest-placed cars from each team.

Calendar 
The 2023 season is contested over eight rounds across Central, Northern and Southern Europe.

Calendar changes
 Rally Azores and Rally Catalunya were removed from the calendar.
 Rally Hungary returned to the calendar after a one-year absence.
 Royal Rally of Scandinavia, which runs on former Rally Sweden stages, was introduced to the calendar.

Regulation changes
Rallies are held over four days. It will also consist of Free Practice and the Qualifying Stage for Rally2 drivers. Starting positions for the leg one are chosen by the drivers, 15 first from the Qualifying Stage choosing first, followed by the drivers with FIA Priority Status, then point scorers from the 2022 ERC season, and then remaining Rally2 drivers. 

The first 15 cars run at 2-minute intervals, rest at 1-minute intervals. For the leg two, first 15 cars run in reverse order based on the leg one classification.

Entry list

ERC

ERC3

ERC4

Results and standings

Season summary

Scoring system 

Points for final position are awarded as in the following table in ERC, ERC3 and ERC4. In ERC, ERC3 and ERC4, the best seven scores from the eight rounds count towards the final number of points. In Junior category, best five rounds of six count.

There are also five bonus points awarded to the winners of the Power Stage, four points for second place, three for third, two for fourth and one for fifth. Power Stage points are awarded only in the main ERC drivers' and co-drivers' championships.

Drivers' Championships

ERC

ERC3

ERC4

Co-drivers' championships

ERC

ERC3

ERC4

Teams' championship

References

External links
Official website
Season 2023 at FIA.com
Season 2023 at ewrc-results.com

European Rally Championship seasons
European Rally
European Rally
Rally